Piancavallo is a ski resort in the Dolomites of northern Italy. It is a frazione of the comune of Aviano, in the province of Pordenone in Friuli-Venezia Giulia.

The nearest railway station is that of Aviano, to which it is connected by regular bus services.

History
Piancavallo was created in the late 1960s, and was the first Italian ski resort with snowmaking facilities. Since the 1980s it has hosted several women's alpine skiing events in the World Cup, and a stage of the Giro d'Italia cycling race.

Winter 
There is an Ice Palace for hockey and ice skating, a roller coaster in the snow, a snow park for children, Nevelandia with inflatable castles and snowtubing.

Notes and references

External links
https://www.turismofvg.it/montagna365/piancavallo

 Consorzio Piancavallo Dolomiti Friulane

Frazioni of the Province of Pordenone
Ski areas and resorts in Italy